Waltzing Tilda is a 2017 post-apocalyptic comedy-drama short film written and directed by Jonathan Wilhelmsson. The story is about Tilda, a lone wolf disillusioned with society who one day finds herself the last human on earth. The film was produced in Australia at Sydney Film School.

Plot 
Tilda (Holly Fraser) is an aimless lone wolf in her early twenties who has grown completely disillusioned with society. One morning she wakes up to find humanity mysteriously gone, and overjoyed she rampages across the city, vandalizing the Sydney Opera House and destroying the Queen Victoria Statue, crowning herself King of the World. Two years later Tilda has gone slightly crazy in her deteriorating kingdom, her only company being a talking, foul-mouthed rabbit named Shane (voiced by Glean De Goya). Shane tries to talk sense into Tilda who is now a severe alcoholic wasting her life away, his point being that she is still a part of the world and needs to take responsibility. Tilda won’t listen, but after inadvertently causing the death of Shane she begins a journey towards maturity, admitting that she’s lived a selfish life that was only given value by the people around her. She sings Waltzing Matilda at a funeral for Shane before finally fading away.

Cast 
 Holly Fraser as Tilda
 Glean De Goya as Shane (voice)
 Bandit the Rabbit as Shane
 Indiana Kwong as Tilda's friend (voice)
 John Buckmaster as Father (voice)

References

External links 

2017 films
2017 short films
Australian comedy short films
2010s science fiction comedy-drama films
Australian science fiction comedy-drama films
2010s English-language films